These are the episodes for the Astro Boy television series. The series ran from January 1, 1963 to December 31, 1966 in Japan and from September 7, 1963 to August 20, 1965 in the U.S. Note that the dubbed episodes aired out of order, and some episodes were skipped.

Episode List

Theme songs

In Japan, 3 different opening variants and 2 different ending variants were used within the anime. In the U.S., though, the same opening and ending was used.

Japan

Openings
 "Mighty Atom Opening Theme Variant 1" 
 "Mighty Atom Opening Theme Variant 2" (includes singing)
 "Mighty Atom Opening Theme Variant 3" (features Uran)

Endings
 "Mighty Atom Ending Theme Variant 1"
 "Mighty Atom Ending Theme Variant 2" (features Uran)

United States

Openings
 "Astro Boy Opening Theme"

Endings
 "Astro Boy Ending Theme"

Home video releases

Japan

VHS
Mighty Atom was released on VHS by Pony Video.

DVD
It was also released on DVD by Nippon Columbia.

Separate sets of episodes were released as well.

The episodes were placed in "Complete Box" Sets in 2008.

United States

VHS
Astro Boy was released on VHS by The Right Stuf.

It was also released under the "30th Anniversary Collector's Series" print.

Episode 34, the "lost episode", was released on a single VHS tape.

DVD
Two Ultra Collector's Edition DVDs were released by The Right Stuf, each containing 52 English dubbed episodes as well as many other features and extras.

They were re-released in Mini Collection sets 3 years later.

A DVD containing the first 5 episodes was also released.

References

Astro Boy
Astro Boy (1963)